Chey Chettha V or Chey Chettha VII (1709–1755), born Ang Snguon, was a Cambodian king in Cambodia's history (r. 1749–1755).

Ang Snguon was the second son of Thommo Reachea III. In 1749, Satha II was installed as the Cambodian king by the Vietnamese Nguyễn lords. Which led Cambodia to become a vassal state of the latter. Ang Snguon drove the Vietnamese army out, and proclaimed himself the new king.

During his reign, he tried to conquer the Cham people in eastern Cambodia. He also allied with the Vietnamese Trịnh lords. In 1753, Nguyễn Phúc Khoát ordered the Nguyễn army to attack Cambodia. Ang Snguon fled to Hà Tiên. With the help of mediation by Mạc Thiên Tứ, Ang Snguon was allowed to come back to Cambodia. As a condition, Tầm Bôn (尋奔, present day Tân An of Long An Province) and Lôi Lạt (雷巤, present day Gò Công of Tiền Giang Province) were ceded to the Nguyễn lords.

References

 A.Dauphin-Meunier Histoire du Cambodge P.U.F Paris 1968.
 Anthony Stokvis, Manuel d'histoire, de généalogie et de chronologie de tous les États du globe, depuis les temps les plus reculés jusqu'à nos jours, préf. H. F. Wijnman, Israël, 1966, Chapitre XIV §.9 "Kambodge" Listes et  tableau généalogique n°34  p. 337-338. 
 Peter Truhart, Regents of Nations, K.G Saur Munich, 1984-1988 , Art. "Kampuchea", p. 1732.

1709 births
1755 deaths
18th-century Cambodian monarchs